Jonathan Blum (writer, born 1967) is an American writer.

Background
Blum was born in Philadelphia, grew up in Miami, Florida  and currently lives in Los Angeles, California.

He graduated from UCLA and the Iowa Writers' Workshop. Since then, he has taught fiction writing at Drew University and the Iowa Summer Writing Festival, and has published short stories, essays, poems, and a novella.

Writing
Blum is the author of two books of fiction: a story collection, The Usual Uncertainties (Rescue Press, 2019), named one of the best short story collections of 2019 by Electric Literature and a novella, Last Word (Rescue Press, 2013), named one of the year's "best books to give as gifts" by Iowa Public Radio.

In November 2013, Last Word was an Editor's Pick at NewPages. Stephen Lovely in The Iowa Review called Last Word "a masterful finesse of unreliable narration."

Blum's short stories have appeared in The Carolina Quarterly, Green Mountains Review, Gulf Coast, Kenyon Review New York Stories, Playboy, and Sonora Review.

Iowa Public Radio included The Usual Uncertainties on their list of best new fiction books for winter 2019.

Awards
Blum has won the Michener-Copernicus Society of America literary award,  the Playboy Magazine College Fiction Contest, a Helene Wurlitzer Foundation fellowship, and a Hawthornden fellowship.

The personal essay "May Be Habit Forming" was a Notable Essay in Best American Essays 2000, edited by Robert Atwan and Alan Lightman.

References

External links
  the lit show interview
 KCRW interview
 Prairie Lights reading

University of California, Los Angeles alumni
Iowa Writers' Workshop alumni
American magazine editors
American science fiction writers
American male novelists
Science fiction editors
1967 births
Living people
American male non-fiction writers